North Shore Girls Soccer Club was a Canadian women's soccer team based in North Vancouver, British Columbia that played in the Women's Premier Soccer League. The club continues to operate as a youth club.

History
North Shore Girls SC was founded in 1986 as a youth soccer club.

In 2015, they hosted a pair of friendlies against the Cameroon national team.

In 2016, they added a team in the Women's Premier Soccer League. They made their debut on May 21, becoming the first Canadian team to play in the WPSL, against OSA Seattle FC, losing 4-1. They recorded their first victory on June 4, defeating 	Eugene Timbers FC Azul 3-1. The team featured many local Canadian players and a complement of NCAA players playing in the school summer break. The team did not return to the league in 2018.

References

Women's soccer clubs in Canada
Women's Premier Soccer League teams
Soccer clubs in British Columbia